Kanaja is an Online encyclopedia developed by Karnataka Knowledge Commission and owned by Government of Karnataka. The portal which offers viewers participation in keep updating the information, serves as a source of information in Kannada language.

Overview
Kanaja was launched on 5 December 2009 and was managed by the International Institute of Information and Technology-Bangalore (IIIT-B). In 2015 government given the responsibility of handling the project to the Department of Kannada and Culture.

Sections
Art
Literature
Science,
Environment
Media
History
Technology
Business.

Updation
The portal information updated constantly with the participation of viewers. The information posted by the viewers would be hosted on the portal after an expert committee verifies the information.

Article creation
In existing article adding additional information, errors identification  and corrections from reader displayed after committee review
New article accepted and reviewed by committee and displayed.

References

Indian online encyclopedias
Government-owned websites of India